Kenneth Vincent Lunt (born 20 November 1979) is an English retired professional footballer and current football coach, who works for Crewe Alexandra as player development manager. Lunt previous played for Crewe, Sheffield Wednesday, Hereford United and Bala Town.

Career

Crewe Alexandra
Lunt is one of many players to emerge from the Crewe Alexandra Academy – alongside Dean Ashton, Rob Hulse and Danny Murphy – nurtured by then manager, Dario Gradi and Crewe Alexandra "Centre of Excellence" manager Bill Prendergast. Having attended the National School at Lilleshall, in the same group of players as Michael Owen, Wes Brown and Michael Ball, Lunt made his Crewe debut, aged 17, on the first day of the 1997–98 season against Swindon Town. He went on to score on his home debut, hitting a 6th-minute volley against Bury in the League Cup.

Lunt completed more than seven years of first team football at Gresty Road, and was previously club captain at Crewe (replacing David Brammer, sold to Stoke City on a free transfer) – a role he shared with Steve Foster.

During Crewe's 2002–03 season in the Football League Second Division Lunt headed the rankings of goal assists. During his time at Crewe, Lunt made over 400 appearances for the club.

Sheffield Wednesday

In May 2006, Sheffield Wednesday beat competition from several other Championship clubs to sign Lunt on a free transfer, offering him a three-year deal. Lunt made his debut for the Owls in their 1–0 defeat to Luton Town. In February 2008 Lunt rejoined Crewe Alexandra on loan until the end of the season.

By the beginning of the 2008–09 season manager Brian Laws stated that Lunt had no first team future at Sheffield Wednesday. Lunt refused to depart, but on 8 May 2009 Lunt and the club reached a mutual agreement to terminate his playing contract with immediate effect.

Hereford United
On 23 June 2009 Lunt signed a one-year contract with Football League Two club Hereford United and was named as captain. He was stripped of the captaincy of the club following a half-time argument with management during a League Cup match at Portsmouth. In May 2011 he signed a new one-year contract with the club.

Bala Town
In August 2012 Kenny Lunt signed for Welsh Premier League side Bala Town following his release from Hereford United.

Coaching and management roles
Having previously been assistant academy director (and u18 manager) at Crewe, Lunt was appointed assistant to first team manager David Artell on 10 January 2017. In March 2022, Artell reshuffled his team and Lunt was appointed player development manager.

Personal life
Lunt is the uncle of current Crewe midfielder Owen Lunt.

Club statistics

Honours
with Crewe Alexandra
Football League Second Division runner-up: 2002–03

References

External links
Kenny Lunt player profile at swfc.co.uk
Kenny Lunt player profile at crewealex.net

1979 births
Living people
English footballers
Crewe Alexandra F.C. players
Sheffield Wednesday F.C. players
Hereford United F.C. players
Sportspeople from Runcorn
English Football League players
Bala Town F.C. players
Cymru Premier players
Association football midfielders